Ross Daniel Etheridge (born 14 September 1994) is an English footballer who most recently played as a goalkeeper for Nuneaton Town.

Playing career
Etheridge began his career at Derby County, but never played for the club. He had loan spells at nearby non-league teams Ilkeston, Gresley and Leek Town, and on 26 January 2015, he was loaned to League One club Crewe Alexandra for a month. Starting on 31 January with their 0–5 loss to Milton Keynes Dons at Gresty Road, he was included for five games for the Railwaymen, but never took to the field. On 9 March, he went on another month-long stint at Stalybridge Celtic, playing ten full Conference North games.

Accrington Stanley
On 29 June 2015, after his release from Derby, Etheridge signed for League Two club Accrington Stanley on a year-long deal. He played the first professional game of his career on 1 September, a 1–2 loss to Bury at the Crown Ground in the first round of the Football League Trophy.

Doncaster Rovers
On 25 May 2016, Etheridge joined fellow League Two side Doncaster Rovers on a two-year deal. Etheridge failed to impress and by mid January 2017 he was third choice keeper following the signing of Ian Lawlor. He was made available for transfer at the end of the season, though a training ground injury where he broke his ankle made this unlikely to happen.

Nuneaton Town
On 25 January 2018, after being released by mutual consent from Doncaster, Etheridge was signed by National League North side Nuneaton Town. He joined Stratford Town on loan in September 2018 and went on to spend the majority of the season with the Southern Premier Central Division club.

Glapwell FC
At the start of the 2020/21 season Etheridge turned down a host of clubs to sign for home club Glapwell FC where he spent his junior years before joining Derby County academy. He Follows in his father Neil's footsteps who himself was No.1 at Glapwell in the 90's. Neil is still connected with the club as a groundskeeper.

Career statistics

Club
.

References

External links
 Accrington Stanley profile
 
 

1995 births
Living people
English footballers
Association football goalkeepers
Derby County F.C. players
Ilkeston Town F.C. (1945) players
Gresley F.C. players
Leek Town F.C. players
Crewe Alexandra F.C. players
Stalybridge Celtic F.C. players
Accrington Stanley F.C. players
Doncaster Rovers F.C. players
Alfreton Town F.C. players
Lincoln City F.C. players
Nuneaton Borough F.C. players
Stratford Town F.C. players
Northern Premier League players
National League (English football) players
English Football League players